Yugoslavia was present at the Eurovision Song Contest 1962, held in Luxembourg, Luxembourg.

Before Eurovision

Jugovizija 1962 
The Yugoslav national final, to select their entry, was held on 23 January at the RTV Zagreb Studios in Zagreb. The host was Mladen Delić. There were 12 songs in the final from four subnational public broadcasters. The subnational public broadcaster  RTV Sarajevo made its debut in the contest. The winner was chosen by the votes of an eight-member jury of experts, one juror for each of the six republics and the two autonomous provinces. The winning entry was "Ne pali svetla u sumrak," performed by Serbian singer Lola Novaković, composed by Jože Privšek and written by Dragutin Britvić. She previously came 4th in the 1961 Yugoslav Final.

At Eurovision
Lola Novaković performed 12th on the night of the Contest following Switzerland and preceding United Kingdom. At the close of the voting the song had received 10 points, placing 4th equal in a field of 16 competing countries.

Voting

Notes

References

External links
Eurodalmatia official ESC club
Eurovision Song Contest National Finals' Homepage
Eurovision France
ESCSerbia.com

1962
Countries in the Eurovision Song Contest 1962
Eurovision